Georges Glaeser (8 November 1918 – 1 September 2002) was a French mathematician who was director of  the IREM of Strasbourg. He worked in analysis and mathematical education and introduced Glaeser's composition theorem and Glaeser's continuity theorem. Glaeser was a Ph.D. student of Laurent Schwartz.

On 3 July 1973, Glaeser filed a complaint against Vichy collaborator Paul Touvier in the Lyon Court, charging him with crimes against humanity. Glaeser accused Touvier of the 1944 massacre at Rillieux-la-Pape, in which Glaeser's father was murdered. Touvier was eventually imprisoned for life on this charge in 1994.

Affiliations
IAS School of Mathematics (9/1961 – 5/1962)

Education
 University of Nancy (Class of 1957)

Selected publications

"Etude de quelques algebres tayloriennes"
"Racine carrée d'une fonction différentiable", Annales de l'Institut Fourier 13, no. 2 (1963), 203–210
"Une introduction à la didactique expérimentale des mathématiques"

References

Sources

 
Bibliography

External links
Glaeser, Georges – The Crisis of geometry teaching

1918 births
2002 deaths
French mathematicians
Mathematical analysts